Şereflikoçhisar, formerly known as Koçhisar, is a town and district of Ankara Province in the Central Anatolia region of Turkey, 148 km south of the city of Ankara. According to 2010 census, population of the district is 35898 of which 29,091 live in the town of Şereflikoçhisar and the remainder in surrounding villages. The district covers an area of 2,034 km², and the average elevation varies between 900 and 1,200 m, with the highest point being Mt. Karasenir at 1,650 m.

The area is a flat dry plain, the only water being Hirfanlı reservoir and the salt lake Lake Tuz. The countryside is inhospitable, with minerals extracted from the salt lake being a major source of income. Therefore, the rural population is migrating to nearby towns or abroad.

Demographics

Name
The name derives from the Seljuk Turkish castle of Koçhisar. The prefix Şerefli meaning "honourable" was added by Atatürk in recognition of the men of the town lost at the battle of Gallipoli.

History

Şereflikoçhisar is believed to have been inhabited since the time of the Hittites and was a thriving town in the Seljuk and Ottoman Empire periods.

Neighbourhoods 

There are 64 neighbourhoods in Şereflikoçhisar as of 2017.

Notes

References

External links
 District governor's official website 
 District municipality's official website 

 
Populated places in Ankara Province
Districts of Ankara Province